Pilgrimage is a 1933 American pre-Code drama film directed by John Ford. The film was a box office disappointment for Fox.

Cast
 Henrietta Crosman as Mrs. Hannah Jessop
 Heather Angel as Suzanne
 Norman Foster as Jim 'Jimmy' Jessop (Hannah's son)
 Lucille La Verne as Mrs. Kelly Hatfield
 Maurice Murphy as Gary Worth
 Marian Nixon as Mary Saunders
 Jay Ward as Jimmy Saunders (Mary and Jimmy Hessop's son)
 Robert Warwick as Major Albertson
 Louise Carter as Mrs. Rogers
 Betty Blythe as Janet Prescot
 Francis Ford as Mayor Elmer Briggs
 Charley Grapewin as Dad Saunders
 Hedda Hopper as Mrs. Worth (Gary Worth's mother)
 Frances Rich as The Nurse
 Shirley Palmer as Nurse

References

External links

1933 films
1933 drama films
American drama films
American black-and-white films
Films directed by John Ford
Fox Film films
Films based on American novels
Films with screenplays by Dudley Nichols
1930s English-language films
1930s American films